Elatocladus is an extinct form genus of Mesozoic sterile conifer leaves, used for shoots with the morphology of "elongated, dorsiventrally flattened leaves with a single vein; divergent from stem". Conifers with leaves of Elatocladus morphology are of uncertain taxonomic position within conifers.

References 

Conifer genera
Triassic plants
Jurassic plants
Cretaceous plants
Prehistoric gymnosperm genera